Tomasz Imieliński (born July 11, 1954 in Toruń, Poland) is a Polish-American computer scientist, most known in the areas of data mining, mobile computing, data extraction, and search engine technology. He is currently a professor of computer science at Rutgers University in New Jersey, United States.

In 2000, he co-founded Connotate Technologies, a web data extraction company based in New Brunswick, NJ. Since 2004 till 2010 he had held multiple positions at Ask.com, from vice president of data solutions intelligence to executive vice president of global search and answers and chief scientist. From 2010 to 2012 he served as VP of data solutions at IAC/Pronto.

Tomasz Imieliński served as chairman of the Computer Science Department at Rutgers University from 1996 to 2003.

He co-founded Art Data Laboratories LLC company, and its product, Articker is the largest known database that aggregates dynamic non-price information about the visual artists in the global art market. Articker has been under an exclusive partnership with Phillips auction house.

Education

Tomasz Imieliński graduated with B.E/M.E degree in electrical engineering from Politechnika Gdańska in Gdańsk, Poland, and received his PhD, in 1982, in computer science, from Polish Academy of Sciences, in Poland, under supervision of Witold Lipski.

Career

After receiving his PhD,  Tomasz Imieliński joined, for a year, faculty at the McGill University School of Computer Science at McGill University in Montreal. Since 1983, he joined the Computer Science Department at Rutgers University, in New Brunswick.  He served as a chairman of the department, from 1996-2003. In 2000, he co-founded Connotate Technologies based on his data extraction research developed at Rutgers University.  While on leave from Rutgers University, from 2004-2010, he had held multiple positions at Ask.com: vice president of data solutions,  executive vice president of global search and answers, and chief scientist. Between 2010-2012, Tomasz Imieliński served as vice president of data solutions at Pronto. Tomasz Imieliński received numerous awards, such as 2018 The Tadeusz Sendzimir  Applied Sciences Award.

Research and recognition 

Imieliński-Lipski Algebras

Imieliński's early work on 'Incomplete Information in Relational Databases'  produced a fundamental concept that became later known as Imieliński-Lipski Algebras.

Cylindric Algebras

According to Van den Bussche, the first people from database community to recognize the connection between Codd's relational algebra and Tarski's cylindric algebras were Witold Lipski and  Tomasz Imieliński, in a talk given at the very first edition of PODS (the ACM Symposium on Principles of Database Systems), in  1982. Their work,"The relational model of data and cylindric algebras" 
was later published in 1984.

Association Rule Mining

His joint 1993 paper with Agrawal and Swami,  'Mining Association Rules Between Sets of Items in Large Databases'
started the association rule mining research area, and it is one of the most cited publications in computer science, with over 24,000 citations according to Google Scholar. This paper received the 2003 - 10 year Test of Time ACM SIGMOD award, and is included in the list of important publications in computer science.

Mobile Computing

Imieliński has also been one of the pioneers of mobile computing and for his joint  1992 paper with Badri Nath on 'Querying in highly mobile distributed environments' he received the VLDB Ten Year Award in 2002.

Geocast

He proposed the idea of Geocast which would deliver information to a group of destinations in a network identified by their geographical locations. He proposed applications such as geographic messaging, geographic advertising, delivery of geographically restricted services, and presence discovery of a service or mobile network participant in a limited geographic area.

Patents

Overall, Imieliński has published over 150 papers and is an inventor and co-inventor on multiple patents ranging from search technology to web data extraction as well as multimedia processing,  data mining, and mobile computing (e.g. patent on "Method and system for audio access to information in a wide area computer network").

His papers have been cited over 43000 times.
Tomasz Imieliński has  been listed as #3, in the area of databases, on the AMiner Most Influential Scholars List, which tracks the top researchers in computer science and engineering.

Other Interests

Tomasz Imieliński formed, in 2000, System Crash, an avant-garde rock group which combined heavy sound with philosophical and political lyrics and multimedia projection of videos and sounds of current world, real and virtual. System Crash consisted of three musicians Tomasz Imielinski  vocal and guitar, James Jeude (bass) and Tomek Unrat (drums). 
Since January 2006, the band had also gone by the name of "The Professor and System Crash", the band title used on their 2006 re-printing of their 2005 CD "War By Remote Control".
Internity, the first show of System Crash, focused on the internet revolution and its philosophical consequences – interplay between the virtual and real world, anthropomorphization of machines, programs and files. All lyrics were written by Tomasz Imieliński. Internity was featured in Knitting Factory, in 2001, and received enthusiastic reviews in Star Ledger and New York Times. System Crash played to sold out audiences and quickly achieved cult status in the avant-garde music scene of New York City. The group stopped performing around 2007.

References

Other selected publications

External links
Tomasz Imieliński's Personal Web page at Rutgers University
Tomasz Imieliński at Google Scholar

Connotate Technologies, Inc
Null (SQL)
Association rule mining
Relational algebra
Imieliński-Lipski Algebras
Mobile Computing
Geocast
Cylindric algebra
List of important publications in computer science

1954 births
Living people
Polish computer scientists
Rutgers University faculty
Gdańsk University of Technology alumni
Polish emigrants to the United States
People from Toruń